The Archdeacon of Durham is a senior ecclesiastical officer of the diocese of Durham (Church of England). They have, within the geographical area the archdeaconry of Durham, pastoral oversight of clergy and care of church buildings (among other responsibilities).

History
The first archdeacons in the diocese occur after the Norman Conquest – around the same time the post of archdeacon first started to occur elsewhere in England. There is no evidence of more than one archdeacon in the diocese until the mid-12th century, when two lines of office holders start to appear in sources. The titles "Archdeacon of Durham" and "Archdeacon of Northumberland" are not recorded until later in the century, although it is possible to discern which of the two lines became which post. Here are listed the sole archdeacons of Durham diocese, then those of the senior of two unnamed lines, then all those called Archdeacon of Durham.

The archdeaconry has been split twice: once on 23 May 1882, to create the Auckland archdeaconry after the Diocese of Newcastle was created from the diocese's other two archdeaconries and a second time in 1997, to create the Sunderland archdeaconry.

List of archdeacons

High Medieval
Sole archdeacons
 bef. 1080–bef. 1083: Leobwine
 aft. 1083–bef. 1093: Thurstan
 11 August 1093– (res.): Turgot of Durham
 bef. 1116–bef. 1128: Michael
Senior archdeacons
 aft. 1122–bef. 1144 (dep.): Robert
 bef. 1147–aft. 1155: Wazo
 bef. 1158–bef. 1172: Vacant
 bef. 1172–6 December 1196 (d.): Burchard du Puiset
 bef. 1197–aft. 1217: Aimeric (also Archdeacon of Carlisle until aft. 1208)
 aft. 1217–bef. 1225 (d.): Simon de Ferlington
 bef. 1224–bef. 1244 (d.): William of Laneham
Archdeacons of Durham
 bef. 1255–1255 (d.): Robert de Cortuna
 bef. 1257–aft. 1272: Robert de Sancta Agatha
 bef. 1275–aft. 1283 (res.): Antony Bek
 bef. 1284–1290 (res.): William of Louth
 bef. 1297–aft. 1309: William de St Botulph

Late Medieval
 bef. 1331–bef. 1331 (d.): Thomas de Goldesburgh
 aft. 1331–bef. 1333 (d.): Amaury de Beaumont
 3 January 1334–bef. 1334 (res.): Robert de Taunton
 31 March 1334–bef. 1361 (d.): Thomas de Neville
 15 August 1362–bef. 1369 (d.): William de Westle
 18 August 1369–bef. 1369 (res.): John de Kyngeston
 6 November 1369–?: John de Stokes
 bef. 1371–1373 (res.): Alexander Neville
 bef. 1378–13 August 1379 (d.): Giacomo Cardinal Orsini, Dean of Salisbury (cardinal-deacon of San Giorgio in Velabro)
 bef. 1380–3 October 1380 (d.): Agapitus Cardinal de Colonna (cardinal-priest of Santa Prisca)
 9 May 1381–bef. 1387 (deprived): Pileus Cardinal de Prata (cardinal-priest of Santa Prassede)
Period of dispute:
 Pope's claimants
 11 August 1387 – 8 August 1394 (d.): Marius Cardinal Bulcano (cardinal-deacon of Santa Maria Nova; judged proper archdeacon in 1393)
 King's/Bishop's claimants
 bef. 1387–bef. 1388: John Maundour
 18 April 1388 – 1393 (d.): Hugh Herle
  1393–bef. 1408 (d.): Thomas de Weston (unopposed after 1394)

 8 October 1408 – 15 February 1409 (res.): Alan de Newark
 16 February 1409 – 1417 (d.): John Hovyngham
 13 October 1417 – 1419 (res.): John Kemp
 bef. 1419: Gabriel Cardinal Condulmier (cardinal-priest of San Clemente; grant ineffective)
 24 March 1419 – 1 August 1425 (res.): Robert Gilbert
 14 August 1425–aft. 1440: Robert Rolleston
 bef. 1448–aft. 1448: William Scrope
 bef. 1452–1456 (res.): George Neville
 aft. 1456–bef. 1466: Thomas Rotherham
 aft. 1466–1497 (d.): Ralph Booth
 20 April 1497–bef. 1500 (res.): Thomas Colston
 20 January 1500 – 1503 (res.): Roger Leyburn
 bef. 1515–January 1556 (d.): William Franklyn (also Dean of Windsor, 1536–1553)

Early modern
 bef. 1559–bef. 1560 (res.): Bernard Gilpin
 22 May 1560–bef. 1563 (res.): John Ebden
 5 December 1563–aft. 1602: John Pilkington
 19 November 1603–bef. 1620 (d.): William Morton
 9 September 1620 – 10 May 1662 (d.): Gabriel Clark
 19 September 1662 – 1 February 1690 (deprived): Denis Granville (also Dean of Durham from 1684; non-juror)
 15 May 1691–bef. 1730 (d.): The Hon Robert Booth
 9 October 1730 – 25 July 1761 (d.): George Sayer
 2 January 1762 – 23 August 1791 (d.): Samuel Dickens
 10 September 1791 – 26 March 1808 (d.): Benjamin Pye
 16 April 1808 – 2 December 1831 (res.): Richard Prosser
 6 December 1831 – 10 October 1862 (d.): Charles Thorp

Late modern
1863–26 October 1882 (d.): Edward Prest
1882–31 August 1922 (d.): Henry Watkins
1922–26 April 1924 (d.): John Quirk, Bishop suffragan of Jarrow
1924–9 May 1932 (d.): Samuel Knight, Bishop suffragan of Jarrow
1932–28 August 1938 (d.): James Gordon, Bishop suffragan of Jarrow
1939–1953 (ret.) Egbert Lucas
1953–1969 (ret.): John Cobham (afterwards archdeacon emeritus)
1970–1993 (res.): Michael Perry
1993–1997 (ret.): Derek Hodgson (afterwards archdeacon emeritus)
1997–2002 (res.): Trevor Willmott
2002–2006 (res.): Stephen Conway
200617 April 2019 (ret.): Ian Jagger
"late summer" 2020 onwards: Libby Wilkinson (announced)

References

Sources

Lists of Anglicans
 
Lists of English people